The Dead is a 2010 British zombie film produced by Indelible Productions and Latitude Films. It was written and directed by the Ford brothers and stars Rob Freeman, Prince David Osei, and David Dontoh.

Plot
Lieutenant Brian Murphy (Freeman), a United States Air Force engineer, is the sole survivor of the final evacuation plane out of Africa, which crashes somewhere off the coast of West Africa. The previous night, a zombie horde attacked many villages throughout that area. Brian gathers supplies from the plane crash and travels by foot until he finds and fixes a broken-down truck in a village he reaches. While driving, the truck gets stuck in a pothole as zombies close in. Daniel Dembele (Osei), a local African soldier gone AWOL in search of his son, rescues Brian from certain death. Daniel's wife had been killed in a zombie attack the previous night and a local military unit, heading north to a military base, had rescued his son. Daniel agrees to lead Brian to the nearest airport, a day's drive away, in exchange for his truck upon arrival for Daniel to use to find his son. At the airport, Brian attempts radioing for help using the air traffic tower's radio, but he receives no response. Daniel gathers fuel for the truck and the two agree it would be best to stick together and attempt travel to the military base, with Daniel hoping his son is there and Brian hoping they have a plane he can repair to fly back to the United States.

They rest for a night at a village that has been converted to a survival colony safeguarded by a group of local soldiers. They leave the following morning. While driving through the African plains, the truck hits a tree, breaking the axle and disabling the vehicle. Brian and Daniel continue on foot and sleep around a fire that night. A zombie horde attacks the group in their sleep, leaving Daniel bitten and badly wounded. They manage to shoot their way out of the attack and continue moving forward. Daniel tells Brian of a necklace he wears and that he planned to pass down to his son. Daniel succumbs to his wounds soon thereafter. Brian continues the trek alone to the northern military base. After an arduous journey through dangerous and rough terrain, Brian reaches the base, which has become a survival colony. He repairs an old radio unit in the base and broadcasts his name, managing to reach fellow American military officer Frank Greaves at a U.S. military base in Henderson, Nevada. It is revealed that the epidemic has reached the United States, which is rapidly failing to hold out. When Brian asks about his family, Frank informs him that "they're gone." Zombies invade the U.S. military base, ending the radio transmission. Brian goes back outside as zombies overwhelm the gates around the colony and begin killing all the survivors. At the last moment, Daniel's son approaches Brian, seeing his father's necklace in his hand, and they turn to face the overwhelming horde that approaches them. The film ends leaving their fate unknown.

Cast

Production
The production encountered many problems, and rather than shooting in the planned six weeks, the crew actually ending up taking 12 weeks. A delay in the shipping of the equipment to Africa initially added three weeks to the schedule; other notable problems included the lead actor Rob Freeman contracting malaria and almost dying in the middle of filming. He was taken to the local hospital and put on an IV drip for several days. Another delay was caused by considerable damage to camera equipment. Shooting took place in Burkina Faso and Ghana. Post-production was done in Brighton, London and Elstree in the UK. The film sound mix was completed by Bafta nominated Adam and Graham Daniel shortly before Christmas 2010. Howard J. Ford published a book, titled Surviving the Dead (2012), that detailed the troubled production history.

Release
The film premiered in August 2010 at Frightfest, and its US premiere was at Fantastic Fest. US and UK rights were acquired by Anchor Bay Entertainment. After a UK theatrical the UK DVD and Blu-ray was released in September 2011. In the U.S., The Dead opened on over 150 screens. The US DVD and Blu-ray commenced in February 2012.

Reception
Review aggregator website Rotten Tomatoes reports a 72% approval rating and an average rating of 5.7/10 based on 18 reviews.  Metacritic rated it 59/100 based on six reviews.  Joe Leydon of Variety wrote, "With nary a trace of snark, satire or self-consciousness, Brit sibling filmmakers Howard J. and Jon Ford breathe some fresh life into zombie-thriller tropes."  Mark Adams of Screen Daily wrote, "And while the story offers nothing particularly new to the genre, The Dead is a film made with passion and enthusiasm and is certainly distinctive in tone and backdrop."  Phelim O'Neill of The Guardian rated it 3/5 stars and wrote, "This low-budget zombie movie rises out of the pack thanks to a smart and ambitious decision to shoot in Burkina Faso."  Neil Genzlinger of The New York Times wrote that the film has a possibly unintended, disturbing metaphorical subtext due to Africans killing each other.  Of the road movie aspects, Genzlinger called it "a long, chemistry-free slog through the zombified countryside".  The Los Angeles Times wrote that the setting initially helps the film's atmosphere but eventually overwhelms it with metaphors of violence in Africa.  John DeFore of The Washington Post criticized casting, acting, and writing, though he said that the gore effects will satisfy horror fans.  Chuck Wilson of The Village Voice called it "Night of the Living Dead  reimagined as a Sergio Leone western".  The Star Tribune rated it 2/4 stars and wrote that the film lacks enough social commentary and creepy scares to make up for its lack of fully using its setting.  Marc Savlov of The Austin Chronicle rated it 3/5 stars and wrote that "the film provides a whole new way of looking at the same old dead things".  Chuck Bowen of Slant Magazine rated it 2/4 stars and called it "a perfectly serviceable horror movie" that "fails to transcend the banality of its inevitable theme".  Matthew Lee of Twitch Film wrote, "Though the brothers generally treat their story with a fair degree of sensitivity, never patronising or exoticising anyone, other than the setting there's nothing that unique about it."  Mike Pereira  of Bloody Disgusting rated it 3/5 stars and called it a "pretty routine" zombie film that will appeal to hardcore zombie fans.  Steve Barton of Dread Central rated it 4/5 stars and called it one of the best recent zombie films.

Sequel

A sequel, The Dead 2: India, was released on 22 August 2013, and then on DVD on 16 September 2014. Unlike the first film, the setting takes place in India. The sequel follows the story of American engineer Nicholas Burton (Joseph Millson) in a race against time to reach his pregnant girlfriend Ishani Sharma (Meenu Mishra) during a virus outbreak. Burton enlists the help of an orphaned street kid Javed (Anand Krishna Goyal), and together, they make a perilous  journey across deadly landscapes as a zombie apocalypse threatens to engulf the entire nation.

References

Further reading

External links
 
 
 
 

2010 films
2010 horror films
2010 independent films
2010s monster movies
2010s road movies
Adventure horror films
British independent films
British post-apocalyptic films
British road movies
British zombie films
Films set in Africa
Films shot in Burkina Faso
Films shot in Ghana
2010s English-language films
2010s British films